Neponset is a district in the southeast corner of Dorchester, Boston, Massachusetts, United States. The Neponset Indians were the original inhabitants of this district and in 1646 John Eliot preached unsuccessfully to the Native American community in Neponset (Dorchester) led by Sachem Cutshamekin before the tribe moved to Ponkapoag.

References

Neighborhoods in Boston
Populated coastal places in Massachusetts